Shah Syed Gholam Sarwar Hosseini was a Bengali politician and the hereditary Pir of Daira Sharif in Noakhali, Bengal Presidency.

Family
Sarwar was from a prominent Bengali Muslim family of Sufi pirs who were based in Dayra Sharif in Shyampur, present-day Ramganj, Lakshmipur District. His ancestor was a Syed who originally settled in Raipur, arriving from Delhi. Golam Sarwar's father and grandfather were known as pious people and followed strict religious rites. They were hereditary servants of Diyara Sharif of Shampur. Diyara Sharif was considered a holy place by all Hindus and Muslims in the area.

Career
He was an elected member of the Bengal Legislative Assembly, representing the radical or "extremist" wing of the Krishak Sramik Party. He was elected as a lawmaker in 1937 but lost in 6 September 1946, being unseated by an All-India Muslim League candidate.

Controversy
It is stated that Hosseini played an important role in the 1946 Noakhali riots.  Ghulam Sarwar Hussaini and his followers started preparing the stage for the massacre by spreading provocative speeches in various rallies. Noakhali was a remote area as it was inhabited by many canals and rivers. He called on the persecuted Biharis in Noakhali. To this end he created a force to provide the Biharis with security and accommodation. It was known as the Miyar Fauj (Miah's Army মিয়ার ফৌজ). On the morning of October 10, he sent a letter to Rajendralal Chowdhury through the Chowkidar and offered to discuss the matter. But when Rajendralal did not respond, Muhammad Ghulam Sarwar Hussaini called a rally of his loyal devotees and Muslims at Shahpur Bazar in the morning. There he highlighted the position of the Muslims at that time and called for the overthrow of the Hindu zamindars. Chittaranjan Roy Chowdhury, the zamindar of Raipur, could not accept the growing political power of the Muslims in Noakhali from the very beginning. With this Muhammad Golam Sarwar Hussaini started a conflict with him. However, Sarwar was sheltering the Biharis as well as making political efforts to stop the riots in Bihar and Calcutta. But the Indian National Congress and the All-India Muslim League did not respond to his efforts. He wrote letters to everyone and wanted a solution to indiscriminate killings. No one played a strong role in the solution and he was very disappointed.

References

Krishak Sramik Party politicians
People from Ramganj Upazila
Year of birth missing
20th-century Bengalis
Year of death missing
Bengal MLAs 1937–1945